Blanquer is a surname. Notable people with the surname include:

Jean-Michel Blanquer (born 1964), French politician, the Minister of Education 
Joan Blanquer i Penedès (1912–2002), Spanish filmmaker and scriptwriter
Rafael Blanquer (born 1945), Spanish long jumper